Diffusion of innovations is a theory that seeks to explain how, why, and at what rate new ideas and technology spread. Everett Rogers, a professor of communication studies, popularized the theory in his book Diffusion of Innovations; the book was first published in 1962, and is now in its fifth edition (2003). Rogers argues that diffusion is the process by which an innovation is communicated over time among the participants in a social system. The origins of the diffusion of innovations theory are varied and span multiple disciplines.
 
Rogers proposes that five main elements influence the spread of a new idea: the innovation itself, adopters, communication channels, time, and a social system. This process relies heavily on social capital. The innovation must be widely adopted in order to self-sustain. Within the rate of adoption, there is a point at which an innovation reaches critical mass. In 1989, management consultants working at the consulting firm Regis Mckenna Inc. theorized that this point lies at the boundary between the early adopters and the early majority. This tipping point between niche appeal and mass (self-sustained) adoption was originally labeled "the marketing chasm"

The categories of adopters are innovators, early adopters, early majority, late majority, and laggards. Diffusion manifests itself in different ways and is highly subject to the type of adopters and innovation-decision process. The criterion for the adopter categorization is innovativeness, defined as the degree to which an individual adopts a new idea.

History 

The concept of diffusion was first studied by the French sociologist Gabriel Tarde in late 19th century and by German and Austrian anthropologists and geographers such as Friedrich Ratzel and Leo Frobenius. The study of diffusion of innovations took off in the subfield of rural sociology in the midwestern United States in the 1920s and 1930s. Agriculture technology was advancing rapidly, and researchers started to examine how independent farmers were adopting hybrid seeds, equipment, and techniques. A study of the adoption of hybrid corn seed in Iowa by Ryan and Gross (1943) solidified the prior work on diffusion into a distinct paradigm that would be cited consistently in the future. Since its start in rural sociology, Diffusion of Innovations has been applied to numerous contexts, including medical sociology, communications, marketing, development studies, health promotion, organizational studies, knowledge management, conservation biology and complexity studies, with a particularly large impact on the use of medicines, medical techniques, and health communications. In organizational studies, its basic epidemiological or internal-influence form was formulated by H. Earl Pemberton, such as postage stamps and standardized school ethics codes.

In 1962, Everett Rogers, a professor of rural sociology at Ohio State University, published his seminal work: Diffusion of Innovations. Rogers synthesized research from over 508 diffusion studies across the fields that initially influenced the theory: anthropology, early sociology, rural sociology, education, industrial sociology and medical sociology. Rogers applied it to the healthcare setting to address issues with hygiene, cancer prevention, family planning, and drunk driving. Using his synthesis, Rogers produced a theory of the adoption of innovations among individuals and organizations. Diffusion of Innovations and Rogers' later books are among the most often cited in diffusion research. His methodologies are closely followed in recent diffusion research, even as the field has expanded into, and been influenced by, other methodological disciplines such as social network analysis and communication.

Elements
The key elements in diffusion research are:

Characteristics of innovations
Studies have explored many characteristics of innovations. Meta-reviews have identified several characteristics that are common among most studies. These are in line with the characteristics that Rogers initially cited in his reviews.

Potential adopters evaluate an innovation on five characteristics:  Relative advantage (the perceived efficiencies gained by the innovation relative to current tools or procedures), its compatibility with the pre-existing system, its complexity or difficulty to learn, its trialability or testability, its potential for reinvention (using the tool for initially unintended purposes), and its observed effects. Relative advantage is subjective, and it only matters that the potential adopter perceives the benefits of the advantage. The greater the perceived advantage, the quicker the innovation will be adopted. With the compatibility condition, the potential adopter takes into account his or her own beliefs, values, and experiences. Slower adoption sprouts from innovations that are outside of societal norms. 

These qualities interact and are judged as a whole. For example, an innovation might be extremely complex, reducing its likelihood to be adopted and diffused, but it might be very compatible with a large advantage relative to current tools. Even with this high learning curve, potential adopters might adopt the innovation anyway.

Studies also identify other characteristics of innovations, but these are not as common as the ones that Rogers lists above. The fuzziness of the boundaries of the innovation can impact its adoption. Specifically, innovations with a small core and large periphery are easier to adopt. Innovations that are less risky are easier to adopt as the potential loss from failed integration is lower. Innovations that are disruptive to routine tasks, even when they bring a large relative advantage, might not be adopted because of added instability. Likewise, innovations that make tasks easier are likely to be adopted. Closely related to relative complexity, knowledge requirements are the ability barrier to use presented by the difficulty to use the innovation. Even when there are high knowledge requirements, support from prior adopters or other sources can increase the chances for adoption.

Characteristics of individual adopters
Like innovations, adopters have been determined to have traits that affect their likelihood to adopt an innovation. A bevy of individual personality traits have been explored for their impacts on adoption, but with little agreement. Ability and motivation, which vary on situation unlike personality traits, have a large impact on a potential adopter's likelihood to adopt an innovation. Unsurprisingly, potential adopters who are motivated to adopt an innovation are likely to make the adjustments needed to adopt it. Motivation can be impacted by the meaning that an innovation holds; innovations can have symbolic value that encourage (or discourage) adoption. First proposed by Ryan and Gross (1943), the overall connectedness of a potential adopter to the broad community represented by a city. Potential adopters who frequent metropolitan areas are more likely to adopt an innovation. Finally, potential adopters who have the power or agency to create change, particularly in organizations, are more likely to adopt an innovation than someone with less power over his choices.

Complementary to the diffusion framework, behavioral models such as Technology acceptance model (TAM) and Unified theory of acceptance and use of technology (UTAUT) are frequently used to understand individual technology adoption decisions in greater details.

Characteristics of organizations
Organizations face more complex adoption possibilities because organizations are both the aggregate of its individuals and its own system with a set of procedures and norms. Three organizational characteristics match well with the individual characteristics above: tension for change (motivation and ability), innovation-system fit (compatibility), and assessment of implications (observability). Organizations can feel pressured by a tension for change. If the organization's situation is untenable, it will be motivated to adopt an innovation to change its fortunes. This tension often plays out among its individual members. Innovations that match the organization's pre-existing system require fewer coincidental changes and are easy to assess and more likely to be adopted. The wider environment of the organization, often an industry, community, or economy, exerts pressures on the organization, too. Where an innovation is diffusing through the organization's environment for any reason, the organization is more likely to adopt it. Innovations that are intentionally spread, including by political mandate or directive, are also likely to diffuse quickly.

Unlike individual decisions where behavioral models (e.g. TAM and UTAUT) can be used to complement the diffusion framework and reveal further details, these models are not directly applicable to organizational decisions. However, research suggested that simple behavioral models can still be used as a good predictor of organizational technology adoption when proper initial screening procedures are introduced.

Process  

Diffusion occurs through a five–step decision-making process. It occurs through a series of communication channels over a period of time among the members of a similar social system. Ryan and Gross first identified adoption as a process in 1943. Rogers' five stages (steps): awareness, interest, evaluation, trial, and adoption are integral to this theory. An individual might reject an innovation at any time during or after the adoption process. Abrahamson examined this process critically by posing questions such as: How do technically inefficient innovations diffuse and what impedes technically efficient innovations from catching on? Abrahamson makes suggestions for how organizational scientists can more comprehensively evaluate the spread of innovations. In later editions of Diffusion of Innovation, Rogers changes his terminology of the five stages to: knowledge, persuasion, decision, implementation, and confirmation. However, the descriptions of the categories have remained similar throughout the editions.

Decisions 

Two factors determine what type a particular decision is:

 Whether the decision is made freely and implemented voluntarily
 Who makes the decision

Based on these considerations, three types of innovation-decisions have been identified.

Rate of adoption 

The rate of adoption is defined as the relative speed at which participants adopt an innovation. Rate is usually measured by the length of time required for a certain percentage of the members of a social system to adopt an innovation. The rates of adoption for innovations are determined by an individual's adopter category. In general, individuals who first adopt an innovation require a shorter adoption period (adoption process) when compared to late adopters.

Within the adoption curve at some point the innovation reaches critical mass. This is when the number of individual adopters ensures that the innovation is self-sustaining.

Adoption strategies 

Rogers outlines several strategies in order to help an innovation reach this stage, including when an innovation adopted by a highly respected individual within a social network and creating an instinctive desire for a specific innovation. Another strategy includes injecting an innovation into a group of individuals who would readily use said technology, as well as providing positive reactions and benefits for early adopters.

Diffusion versus adoption 

Adoption is an individual process detailing the series of stages one undergoes from first hearing about a product to finally adopting it. Diffusion signifies a group phenomenon, which suggests how an innovation spreads.

Adopter categories
Rogers defines an adopter category as a classification of individuals within a social system on the basis of innovativeness. In the book Diffusion of Innovations, Rogers suggests a total of five categories of adopters in order to standardize the usage of adopter categories in diffusion research. The adoption of an innovation follows an S curve when plotted over a length of time. The categories of adopters are: innovators, early adopters, early majority, late majority and laggards In addition to the gatekeepers and opinion leaders who exist within a given community, change agents may come from outside the community. Change agents bring innovations to new communities– first through the gatekeepers, then through the opinion leaders, and so on through the community.

Failed diffusion 

Failed diffusion does not mean that the technology was adopted by no one. Rather, failed diffusion often refers to diffusion that does not reach or approach 100% adoption due to its own weaknesses, competition from other innovations, or simply a lack of awareness. From a social networks perspective, a failed diffusion might be widely adopted within certain clusters but fail to make an impact on more distantly related people. Networks that are over-connected might suffer from a rigidity that prevents the changes an innovation might bring, as well.
Sometimes, some innovations also fail as a result of lack of local involvement and community participation.

For example, Rogers discussed a situation in Peru involving the implementation of boiling drinking water to improve health and wellness levels in the village of Los Molinas. The residents had no knowledge of the link between sanitation and illness. The campaign worked with the villagers to try to teach them to boil water, burn their garbage, install latrines and report cases of illness to local health agencies. In Los Molinas, a stigma was linked to boiled water as something that only the "unwell" consumed, and thus, the idea of healthy residents boiling water prior to consumption was frowned upon. The two-year educational campaign was considered to be largely unsuccessful. This failure exemplified the importance of the roles of the communication channels that are involved in such a campaign for social change. An examination of diffusion in El Salvador determined that there can be more than one social network at play as innovations are communicated. One network carries information and the other carries influence. While people might hear of an innovation's uses, in Rogers' Los Molinas sanitation case, a network of influence and status prevented adoption.

Heterophily and communication channels 

Lazarsfeld and Merton first called attention to the principles of homophily and its opposite, heterophily. Using their definition, Rogers defines homophily as "the degree to which pairs of individuals who interact are similar in certain attributes, such as beliefs, education, social status, and the like". When given the choice, individuals usually choose to interact with someone similar to themselves. Homophilous individuals engage in more effective communication because their similarities lead to greater knowledge gain as well as attitude or behavior change. As a result, homophilous people tend to promote diffusion among each other. However, diffusion requires a certain degree of heterophily to introduce new ideas into a relationship; if two individuals are identical, no diffusion occurs because there is no new information to exchange. Therefore, an ideal situation would involve potential adopters who are homophilous in every way, except in knowledge of the innovation.

Promotion of healthy behavior provides an example of the balance required of homophily and heterophily. People tend to be close to others of similar health status. As a result, people with unhealthy behaviors like smoking and obesity are less likely to encounter information and behaviors that encourage good health. This presents a critical challenge for health communications, as ties between heterophilous people are relatively weaker, harder to create, and harder to maintain. Developing heterophilous ties to unhealthy communities can increase the effectiveness of the diffusion of good health behaviors. Once one previously homophilous tie adopts the behavior or innovation, the other members of that group are more likely to adopt it, too.

The role of social systems

Opinion leaders 

Not all individuals exert an equal amount of influence over others. In this sense opinion leaders are influential in spreading either positive or negative information about an innovation. Rogers relies on the ideas of Katz & Lazarsfeld and the two-step flow theory in developing his ideas on the influence of opinion leaders.

Opinion leaders have the most influence during the evaluation stage of the innovation-decision process and on late adopters. In addition opinion leaders typically have greater exposure to the mass media, more cosmopolitan, greater contact with change agents, more social experience and exposure, higher socioeconomic status, and are more innovative than others.

Research was done in the early 1950s at the University of Chicago attempting to assess the cost-effectiveness of broadcast advertising on the diffusion of new products and services. The findings were that opinion leadership tended to be organized into a hierarchy within a society, with each level in the hierarchy having most influence over other members in the same level, and on those in the next level below it. The lowest levels were generally larger in numbers and tended to coincide with various demographic attributes that might be targeted by mass advertising. However, it found that direct word of mouth and example were far more influential than broadcast messages, which were only effective if they reinforced the direct influences. This led to the conclusion that advertising was best targeted, if possible, on those next in line to adopt, and not on those not yet reached by the chain of influence.

Research on actor-network theory (ANT) also identifies a significant overlap between the ANT concepts and the diffusion of innovation which examine the characteristics of innovation and its context among various interested parties within a social system to assemble a network or system which implements innovation.

Other research relating the concept to public choice theory finds that the hierarchy of influence for innovations need not, and likely does not, coincide with hierarchies of official, political, or economic status. Elites are often not innovators, and innovations may have to be introduced by outsiders and propagated up a hierarchy to the top decision makers.

Electronic communication social networks 

Prior to the introduction of the Internet, it was argued that social networks had a crucial role in the diffusion of innovation particularly tacit knowledge in the book The IRG Solution – hierarchical incompetence and how to overcome it. The book argued that the widespread adoption of computer networks of individuals would lead to much better diffusion of innovations, with greater understanding of their possible shortcomings and the identification of needed innovations that would not have otherwise occurred. The social model proposed by Ryan and Gross is expanded by Valente who uses social networks as a basis for adopter categorization instead of solely relying on the system-level analysis used by Ryan and Gross. Valente also looks at an individual's personal network, which is a different application than the organizational perspective espoused by many other scholars.

Recent research by Wear shows, that particularly in regional and rural areas, significantly more innovation takes place in communities which have stronger inter-personal networks.

Organizations 

Innovations are often adopted by organizations through two types of innovation-decisions: collective innovation decisions and authority innovation decisions. The collective decision occurs when adoption is by consensus. The authority decision occurs by adoption among very few individuals with high positions of power within an organization. Unlike the optional innovation decision process, these decision processes only occur within an organization or hierarchical group. Research indicated that, with proper initial screening procedures, even simple behavioral model can serve as a good predictor for technology adoption in many commercial organizations. Within an organization certain individuals are termed "champions" who stand behind an innovation and break through opposition. The champion plays a very similar role as the champion used within the efficiency business model Six Sigma. The process contains five stages that are slightly similar to the innovation-decision process that individuals undertake. These stages are: agenda-setting, matching, redefining/restructuring, clarifying and routinizing.

Extensions of the theory

Policy 

Diffusion of Innovations has been applied beyond its original domains.
In the case of political science and administration, policy diffusion focuses on how institutional innovations are adopted by other institutions, at the local, state, or country level. An alternative term is 'policy transfer' where the focus is more on the agents of diffusion and the diffusion of policy knowledge, such as in the work of Diane Stone. Specifically, policy transfer can be defined as "knowledge about how policies administrative arrangements, institutions, and ideas in one political setting (past or present) is used in the development of policies, administrative arrangements, institutions, and ideas in another political setting".

The first interests with regards to policy diffusion were focused in time variation or state lottery adoption, but more recently interest has shifted towards mechanisms (emulation, learning and coercion) or in channels of diffusion where researchers find that regulatory agency creation is transmitted by country and sector channels. At the local level, examining popular city-level policies make it easy to find patterns in diffusion through measuring public awareness. At the international level, economic policies have been thought to transfer among countries according to local politicians' learning of successes and failures elsewhere and outside mandates made by global financial organizations. As a group of countries succeed with a set of policies, others follow, as exemplified by the deregulation and liberalization across the developing world after the successes of the Asian Tigers. The reintroduction of regulations in the early 2000s also shows this learning process, which would fit under the stages of knowledge and decision, can be seen as lessons learned by following China's successful growth.

Technology 

Peres, Muller and Mahajan suggested that diffusion is "the process of the market penetration of new products and services that is driven by social influences, which include all interdependencies among consumers that affect various market players with or without their explicit knowledge".

Eveland evaluated diffusion from a phenomenological view, stating, "Technology is information, and exists only to the degree that people can put it into practice and use it to achieve values".

Diffusion of existing technologies has been measured using "S curves". These technologies include radio, television, VCR, cable, flush toilet, clothes washer, refrigerator, home ownership, air conditioning, dishwasher, electrified households, telephone, cordless phone, cellular phone, per capita airline miles, personal computer and the Internet. These data can act as a predictor for future innovations.

Diffusion curves for infrastructure reveal contrasts in the diffusion process of personal technologies versus infrastructure.

Consequences of adoption 

Both positive and negative outcomes are possible when an individual or organization chooses to adopt a particular innovation. Rogers states that this area needs further research because of the biased positive attitude that is associated with innovation. Rogers lists three categories for consequences: desirable vs. undesirable, direct vs. indirect, and anticipated vs. unanticipated.

In contrast Wejnert details two categories: public vs. private and benefits vs. costs.

Public versus private 

Public consequences comprise the impact of an innovation on those other than the actor, while private consequences refer to the impact on the actor. Public consequences usually involve collective actors, such as countries, states, organizations or social movements. The results are usually concerned with issues of societal well-being. Private consequences usually involve individuals or small collective entities, such as a community. The innovations are usually concerned with the improvement of quality of life or the reform of organizational or social structures.

Benefits versus costs 

Benefits of an innovation obviously are the positive consequences, while the costs are the negative. Costs may be monetary or nonmonetary, direct or indirect. Direct costs are usually related to financial uncertainty and the economic state of the actor. Indirect costs are more difficult to identify. An example would be the need to buy a new kind of pesticide to use innovative seeds. Indirect costs may also be social, such as social conflict caused by innovation. Marketers are particularly interested in the diffusion process as it determines the success or failure of a new product. It is quite important for a marketer to understand the diffusion process so as to ensure proper management of the spread of a new product or service.

Intended versus Unintended 

The diffusion of innovations theory has been used to conduct research on the unintended consequences of new interventions in public health. In the book multiple examples of the unintended negative consequences of technological diffusion are given. The adoption of automatic tomato pickers developed by Midwest agricultural colleges led to the adoption of harder tomatoes (disliked by consumers) and the loss of thousands of jobs leading to the collapse of thousands of small farmers. In another example, the adoption of snowmobiles in Saami reindeer herding culture is found to lead to the collapse of their society with widespread alcoholism and unemployment for the herders, ill-health for the reindeer (such as stress ulcers, miscarriages) and a huge increase in inequality.

Mathematical treatment 

The diffusion of an innovation typically follows an S shaped curve which often resembles a logistic function. Mathematical programming models such as the S-D model apply the diffusion of innovations theory to real data problems. In addition to that, agent-based models follow a more intuitive process by designing individual-level rules to model diffusion of ideas and innovations.

Complex systems models 

Complex network models can also be used to investigate the spread of innovations among individuals connected to each other by a network of peer-to-peer influences, such as in a physical community or neighborhood.

Such models represent a system of individuals as nodes in a network (or graph). The interactions that link these individuals are represented by the edges of the network and can be based on the probability or strength of social connections. In the dynamics of such models, each node is assigned a current state, indicating whether or not the individual has adopted the innovation, and model equations describe the evolution of these states over time.

In threshold models, the uptake of technologies is determined by the balance of two factors: the (perceived) usefulness (sometimes called utility) of the innovation to the individual as well as barriers to adoption, such as cost. The multiple parameters that influence decisions to adopt, both individual and socially motivated, can be represented by such models as a series of nodes and connections that represent real relationships. Borrowing from social network analysis, each node is an innovator, an adopter, or a potential adopter. Potential adopters have a threshold, which is a fraction of his neighbors who adopt the innovation that must be reached before he will adopt. Over time, each potential adopter views his neighbors and decides whether he should adopt based on the technologies they are using. When the effect of each individual node is analyzed along with its influence over the entire network, the expected level of adoption was seen to depend on the number of initial adopters and the network's structure and properties. Two factors emerge as important to successful spread of the innovation: the number of connections of nodes with their neighbors and the presence of a high degree of common connections in the network (quantified by the clustering coefficient). These models are particularly good at showing the impact of opinion leaders relative to others. Computer models are often used to investigate this balance between the social aspects of diffusion and perceived intrinsic benefit to the individuals.

Criticism 

Even though there have been more than four thousand articles across many disciplines published on Diffusion of Innovations, with a vast majority written after Rogers created a systematic theory, there have been few widely adopted changes to the theory. Although each study applies the theory in slightly different ways, this lack of cohesion has left the theory stagnant and difficult to apply with consistency to new problems.

Diffusion is difficult to quantify because humans and human networks are complex. It is extremely difficult, if not impossible, to measure what exactly causes adoption of an innovation. This is important, particularly in healthcare. Those encouraging adoption of health behaviors or new medical technologies need to be aware of the many forces acting on an individual and his or her decision to adopt a new behavior or technology. Diffusion theories can never account for all variables, and therefore might miss critical predictors of adoption. This variety of variables has also led to inconsistent results in research, reducing heuristic value.

Rogers placed the contributions and criticisms of diffusion research into four categories: pro-innovation bias, individual-blame bias, recall problem, and issues of equality. The pro-innovation bias, in particular, implies that all innovation is positive and that all innovations should be adopted. Cultural traditions and beliefs can be consumed by another culture's through diffusion, which can impose significant costs on a group of people. The one-way information flow, from sender to receiver, is another weakness of this theory. The message sender has a goal to persuade the receiver, and there is little to no reverse flow. The person implementing the change controls the direction and outcome of the campaign. In some cases, this is the best approach, but other cases require a more participatory approach. In complex environments where the adopter is receiving information from many sources and is returning feedback to the sender, a one-way model is insufficient and multiple communication flows need to be examined.

See also

References

Notes

External links

 The Diffusion Simulation Game, about adopting an innovation in education. 
 The Pencil Metaphor on diffusion of innovation.
 Diffusion of Innovations, Strategy and Innovations. The D.S.I Framework by Francisco Rodrigues Gomes, Academia.edu share research.

Innovation economics
Innovation
Diffusion
Product management
Product development
Management cybernetics
Memetics
Stage theories
Sociology of culture